Bossiaea eremaea is a species of flowering plant in the family Fabaceae and is endemic to Western Australia. It is an openly-branched, spreading, more or less leafless shrub with deep yellow and purplish flowers.

Description

Taxonomy and naming
Bossiaea eremaea was first formally described in 2006 by James Henderson Ross in the journal Muelleria from specimens he collected east of Mount Magnet in 1998. The specific epithet (eremaea) means "desert", referring to the deep sand in which this species grows.

Distribution and habitat
This bossiaea grows in deep sand in woodland from near Sandstone to near Laverton in the Great Victoria Desert and  Murchison biogeographic regions of Western Australia.

Conservation status
Bossiaea eremaea is classified as "Priority Three" by the Government of Western Australia Department of Parks and Wildlife meaning that it is poorly known and known from only a few locations but is not under imminent threat.

References

eremaea
Eudicots of Western Australia
Plants described in 2006